Revolutionary Union (UR) was a fascist political party in Peru that lasted from 1931 to 1942.  It was founded in 1931 by Luis Miguel Sánchez Cerro and became the governing party that same year. It took part in elections in 1931 and 1945. In 1933 the leadership was taken over by Luis A. Flores who sought to mobilize mass support for the group's nationalism in a manner akin to fascism. He even started a Blackshirts paramilitary arm as a copy of the Italian group. The Union first achieved its political victories in the 1930s, after which it faded into obscurity.

References

Political parties established in 1931
Defunct political parties in Peru
Fascist parties

Peruvian fascists